The Organization for Human Brain Mapping (OHBM) is an organization of scientists with the main aim of organizing an annual meeting ("Annual Meeting of the Organization for Human Brain Mapping").

The organization was established in 1995 at the first conference which was a Paris satellite meeting of the meeting of the International Society for Cerebral Blood Flow and Metabolism (ISCBFM) in Cologne.
Although the 1999 meetings of the two societies were coordinated, ISCBFM and OHBM are now completely split.
The organizers of the Paris meeting were Bernard Mazoyer, Rüdiger Seitz and Per Roland.

The stated mission of the organization is "to advance the understanding of the anatomical and functional organization of the human brain" by bringing "together scientists of various backgrounds who are engaged in investigations relevant to human brain organization" and engaging "in other activities to facilitate communication among these scientists and promote education in human brain organization."
Among the past and present council members of the organizations have been David Van Essen, Russell Poldrack, Leslie Ungerleider, Alan Evans, Albert Gjedde, Richard Frackowiak, Marcus Raichle and Karl Friston.

Since the human brain mapping field is cross-disciplinary the members range from neurologists, psychiatrists and psychologists to physicists, engineers, software developers and statisticians.
The OHBM meetings now draws 2500–3000 attendees each year.

Besides organizing meetings the organization has also advocated for data sharing in its field and established a task force on neuroinformatics.
This was at a time when Michael Gazzaniga set up the fMRI Data Center, which required researchers to submit scans from functional magnetic resonance imaging when publishing in Journal of Cognitive Neuroscience.

In 2014, the organization established the Glass Brain Award, a lifetime achievement award.
The Young Investigator Award (formerly Wiley Young Investigator Award) is also awarded by the organization. as well as the Replication Award.

The members of the organization have benefited from reduced rates for the academic journals NeuroImage and Human Brain Mapping.
Its administrative office is in Minneapolis.

References

External links 
 

Neuroscience organizations
International scientific organizations
International organizations based in the United States
Scientific organizations based in the United States
Organizations based in Minneapolis
Scientific organizations established in 1995